Nidaros Hockey is an ice hockey team in Trondheim, Norway. They currently play in the First Division, the second level of Norwegian ice hockey. The team plays its home games in the Leangen Ishall.

History
Following the bankruptcy of Rosenborg IHK in 2014, the city of Trondheim was left without a team in the two highest ice hockey leagues of Norway. In an attempt to bring back an elite hockey team to Trondheim, Nidaros Hockey was founded in the middle of 2015. 

On 12 March 2016, Nidaros Hockey was promoted to the 2016-17 First division, the second tier of Norwegian hockey.

External links
Official website

Ice hockey teams in Norway
Ice hockey clubs established in 2015
2015 establishments in Norway
Sport in Trondheim